Rock Branch is a stream in Warren County in the U.S. state of Missouri. It is a tributary of Camp Creek.

The name "Rock Branch" is illustrative of its rocky character.

See also
List of rivers of Missouri

References

Rivers of Warren County, Missouri
Rivers of Missouri